Camden County Schools may refer to:

 Camden County Schools (North Carolina) in Camden County, North Carolina
 Camden County School District in Camden County, Georgia
 Camden County Technical Schools in Camden County, New Jersey